The Vranjina Monastery, also known as the Vranina Monastery or St. Nicholas' Monastery, is a Serbian Orthodox monastery on the south-east part of Vranjina island on Skadar Lake in Montenegro. Vranjina Monastery with its church dedicated to Saint Nicholas is one of the oldest monasteries in Montenegro.

History 
Based on the 1233 chrysobull of Rastko Nemanjić (Saint Sava), the oldest document mentioning this monastery, it can be concluded that it was founded between 1221 and 1223 by Sava, the first archbishop of the autocephalous Serbian Church, or by Ilarion Šišojević, the first metropolitan bishop of the Metropolitanate of Zeta.
According to some accounts, Ilarion was buried in the courtyard of the monastery.

The monastic metochion was initially formed by land and income granted to the monastery by members of the Nemanjić dynasty, who gave the richest donations to the monastery. Saint Sava granted some land of the Holy Savior metochion on Plavnica to Vranjina, while King Stefan Vladislav granted the Crmnica villages of Godinje, Medveđa Glava and Kruševica to the monastery, and queen Helen of Anjou granted it land around Krnjica and Uljanik in Kruševica in 1280. Around 1296 King Stefan Milutin granted the village of Orahovo and 100 perpers of income from the Sveti Srdj market near Skadar to the monastery. Vranjina soon became famous for its richness. In 1348, Emperor Stefan Dušan awarded the monastery together with half of its income to the church in Jerusalem dedicated to Archangel Michael (believed to be founded by King Milutin). That way Vranjina became a metochion of the Church of Archangel Michael in Jerusalem. Charters of Vranjina in the 14th century mentioned  Albanian (Arbanas), Vlah, Latin (Catholic citizen) and Serb in ethnic sense as those who could do damage to property of monastery.

Vranjina was later granted with rich estates by members of the Balšić and Crnojević noble families who ruled Zeta. In 1404 Đurađ Stracimirović gave the village of Rake to the monastery while Balša III gave it a salt pond (1417) and the village of Karuč in Crmnica (1420). In the period after Nemanjić rule, during which all estates belonged to the supreme monarch, minor local nobility began to lay ownership claims to the land, some even taking parts of monastic metochions. The famous assembly took place in the monastery on the 6th of September 1455, when amidst the growing Turkish threat, the higland tribes swore allegiance to the Venetian republic in the presence of the Venetian proveditor. Stefan Crnojević, duke of Zeta who had already aligned himself with the Venetians, organised the assembly and was also present. In the matters of the church, the assembly is pivotal for the preservance of the authority of the Metropolitanate of Zeta which at the time rivaled the uncanonical and, in accordance with the Republics politics following the Council of Florence, Venetian installed  Greek Uniate metropolitan seated at the Ostros monastery. The assembly officially reguested for their metropolitan to be a Slav and for the Vranjina, where the Metropolitanate was located at the time, to be recognised as the official seat. In 1469 Ivan Crnojević returned all of Vranjina's former estates which included villages in Zeta valley, Limljani, Limsko Polje, Brčeli, Optočići, Tomići and Šišovići. In 1478, during the Siege of Shkodra, sultan Mehmed the Conqueror confirmed all existing rights and privileges to the monastery in order to gain support from the surrounding tribes.

The monastery was a temporary seat of the Metropolitanate of Zeta after the destruction of the Holy Archangel Michael monastery in 1441 and remained so until 1481 when, because of the vicinity of the frontlines, the seat was briefly moved to the Kom Monastery. Finally, Ivan Crnojević moved it to Cetinje in 1485. In the beginning of the 16th century the pressure on its properties was renewed, this time by the neighboring villages, so the monastery had to plead to Skenderbeg Crnojević for the protection of its rights in 1527. The monastery was so poor in the 17th century that in 1665 its hegumen, together with hegumen of Moračnik Monastery, requested help from the Catholic bishop of Scutari Pjetër Bogdani. It was arsoned by the Ottoman forces in 1714 during the Numan Pasha's invasion of Montenegro. The 9 defenders of the monastery, including its hegumen Nikolaj from Podgori and Voivoda Ratko Orlandić who were badly outnumbered, fortified themselves in the monastery were they were burned alive.

References

Further reading 
 

Serbian Orthodox monasteries in Montenegro
13th-century Serbian Orthodox church buildings
Kingdom of Serbia (medieval)
Buildings and structures in Podgorica
Tourist attractions in Podgorica
Nemanjić dynasty endowments
Medieval Serbian Orthodox monasteries
Christian monasteries established in the 13th century
Medieval Montenegro